Vieira's long-tongued bat (Xeronycteris vieirai) is a species of bat from northeastern Brazil, discovered in 2005 by Gregorin and Ditchfield. It is the only species in the genus Xeronycteris.

References

Phyllostomidae
Bats of Brazil
Endemic fauna of Brazil
Mammals described in 2005